Hélène Menexia Massam (died August 22, 2020) was a statistician known for her research on the Wishart distribution and on graphical models. She was a professor of mathematics and statistics at York University in Canada.

Education and career
Massam earned a bachelor's degree from McGill University in 1971. She stayed on at McGill for graduate studies, earning a master's degree in 1973 and completing her doctorate in 1977. Her dissertation, Mathematical Programming with Cones, concerned numerical analysis and was supervised by Sanjo Zlobec. She joined the York University faculty in 1984, and taught there for 35 years until her death.

Recognition
In 2008, Massam was named a Fellow of the Institute of Mathematical Statistics "for contributions to Wishart distributions and to graphical models".

References

Year of birth missing
20th-century births
2020 deaths
Canadian statisticians
Women statisticians
Fellows of the Institute of Mathematical Statistics
McGill University alumni
Academic staff of York University